Korea is an unincorporated community in Culpeper County, in the U.S. state of Virginia.

History
A post office called Korea was established in 1899, and remained in operation until it was discontinued in 1951. The community was named after Korea, in East Asia.

References

Unincorporated communities in Culpeper County, Virginia
Unincorporated communities in Virginia